The penanggal or penanggalan is a nocturnal vampiric entity from Malay ghost myths. Its name comes from the word tanggal meaning to remove or take off, because its form is that of a floating disembodied woman's head with its trailing organs still attached. From afar, it twinkles like a ball of flame, providing an explanation for the will-o'-the-wisp phenomenon.

The penanggalan exists by different names in different parts of Southeast Asia. It is known as balan-balan in Sabah, tengelong or tengalong in Kedah, hantu polong by the Temuan, leyak in Bali, kuyang in Kalimantan, palasik in West Sumatra, kra-sue in Thailand, kasu in Laos, ahp in Cambodia, and manananggal in the Philippines.

Though commonly referred to in its native languages as a ghost, the penanggalan cannot be readily classified as a classical undead being. Rather, it is a witch that developed the ability to take such a form through meditation in a vat of vinegar. The creature is, for all intents and purposes, a living human being during daytime or at any time when it does not detach itself from its body. The penanggalan often hunts at night for menstruation/blood from birth. It also hunts for pregnant women and young children.

Nature 

In Malaysian folklore, penanggal are mortal women who practice black magic. To become a penanggal, a woman must meditate during a ritual bath in vinegar, with her whole body submerged except for the head. Only active in penanggal form at night, the creature regularly soaks its organs in vinegar to shrink them for easy entry back into her body. The penanggal thus carries an odor of vinegar wherever she flies, and returns to her body during the daytime, passing as an ordinary woman. However, a penanggal can always be told from an ordinary woman by the smell of vinegar. The penanggal was also mentioned in Hikayat Abdullah, written in 1845, much to the amusement of Sir Stamford Raffles:

"The pĕnanggalan was once a woman; she used the magic arts of a demon whom she trusted by devoting herself to his service day and night for an agreed term, after which she was able to fly; that is to say her head and neck could fly when loosened from her body with the viscera depending from them, while the body remained behind; wherever the person whom she wished to injure might live, thither flew her head and bowels to suck his blood."

Modern urban legends offer alternative views of the penanggal. This includes being the result of a curse, or the breaking of a demonic pact. One story tells of a young woman who was taking a ritual bath in a tub that once held vinegar. While bathing herself and in a state of concentration or meditation, a man entered the room without warning and startled her. The woman was so shocked that she jerked her head up to look, moving so quickly as to sever her head from her body, her organs and entrails pulling out of the neck opening. Enraged by what the man had done, she flew after him, a vicious head trailing organs and dripping venom. Her empty body was left behind in the vat.

Victims 
The penanggalans victims are traditionally pregnant women and young children. As traditional Malay dwellings were stilt-houses, the penanggal would hide under the stilts of the house and use its long tongue to lap up the blood of the new mother. Those whose blood the penanggalan feeds on contract a wasting disease that is almost inescapably fatal. Furthermore, even if the penanggalan is not successful in her attempt to feed, anyone who is brushed by the dripping entrails will suffer painful open sores that won't heal without a bomoh's help.

The most common protection against a penanggal attack is to scatter the thorny leaves of any of the subspecies of a local plant known as mengkuang, which has sharp thorny leaves and would either trap or injure the exposed lungs, stomach and intestines of the penanggal as it flies in search of its prey. These thorns, on the vine, can also be looped around the windows of a house in order to snare the trailing organs. This is commonly done when a woman has just given birth. The shards of glass glued to the top of the walls around a house serve the same purpose, in addition to protecting against thieves. As an extra precaution, the pregnant woman can keep scissors or betel nut cutters under her pillow, as the penanggalan is afraid of these items.

Once the penanggal leaves its body and is safely away, it may be permanently destroyed by either pouring pieces of broken glass into the empty neck cavity, which will sever the internal organs of the penanggal when it reattaches to the body; or by sanctifying the body and then destroying it by cremation or by somehow preventing the penanggal from reattaching to its body by sunrise.

Another non-lethal way to get rid of penanggalan is to turn over the body, so that when the head attached back it will be attached reverse side, thereby revealing to everyone what she really is.

In popular culture 
 The penanggalan was listed as a monster in the 1981 Dungeons & Dragons rulebook Fiend Folio. 
 In Hellboy: The Troll Witch and Others comics, Hellboy travels to Malaysia in 1958 where a village devoid of Bomoh shaman has fallen victim to a demonic penanggalan. 
 In the 2016 Image Comic Cry Havoc a character named Sri reveals that she is a penanggalan and describes how her head detaches from her body and "slithers around like an electric eel". 
 The miniature game Malifaux by Wyrd Miniatures contains a character Yin the Penanggalan. 
Penanggalans are enemies in the 2019 video game Indivisible, where they attack by spitting bile.
 SCP-1060 from SCP Foundation is a Penanggalan.
 The Penanggalan is listed as an enemy type in the 1991 RPG Dark Conspiracy in the supplement Dark Races where it is described as a parasite that resides in a hosts skull, detaching when threatened.
Season 3 episode 6 of Creepshow (Drug Traffic by Mattie Do & Christopher Larsen) features a Penanggalan.
The creatures known as Canyonggalans/Canyon Crowns in the YouTube analogue horror series The Monument Mythos is based on a Penanggalan.
The Netflix: School Tales The Series episode Beautiful a woman name Aim becomes a penanggalan when she wished to become beautiful now has to pay the prices to being pretty.
In the Gearwitch Chronicles novel, "The Always Machine", one of the minor antagonists is a penanggalan.
Director Monte Light's 2022 film "Blood Covered Chocolate" has various references to a penanggalan.

See also 
 Hantu (supernatural creature)
 Chonchon, a Mapuche creature that also detaches its head
 Langsuyar
 Leyak
 Polong
 Rokurokubi and Nukekubi, Japanese yokai which take the form of a woman with either an extremely long neck or a head which can detach itself and move freely from the body
 Vampires in popular culture

References

External links
Gambar-gambar penanggal 
 An Introduction to Malaysian Ghouls & Vampires

Female legendary creatures
Jinniyyat
Jinn
Malaysian mythology
Malaysian legendary creatures
Mythological hematophages